Khaneqah (also Romanized as Khāneqāh and Khānqāh; also known as Khāngāh) is a village in Howli Rural District, in the Central District of Paveh County, Kermanshah Province, Iran. At the 2006 census, its population was 1,463, in 394 families.

References 

Populated places in Paveh County